Jerry Janezich (born March 16, 1950) is a Minnesota politician, a former member of the Minnesota legislature, and a former candidate for the United States Senate. Janezich served two terms in the Minnesota House of Representatives, and two terms in the Minnesota Senate.

Biography
Janezich was born the son of an iron miner on Minnesota's Iron Range. He received a bachelor's degree in speech from St. Cloud State University. Later, he co-founded and operated a bar in his home town of Chisholm, Minnesota.

Janezich was first elected to the state house of representatives in 1988, and served two terms, before running successfully for state senate in 1992. In 2000, he sought the Democratic-Farmer-Labor Party (DFL) endorsement for the senate seat held by Republican Sen. Rod Grams. Janezich won the endorsement of his party at its state convention, but lost in the primary election to former State Auditor Mark Dayton.

Janezich retired from politics after his term expired in 2001. He is married, and has three children.

References

1950 births
Living people
People from Chisholm, Minnesota
Democratic Party members of the Minnesota House of Representatives
Democratic Party Minnesota state senators